The 2018 Intercontinental Cup (known as the 2018 Hero Intercontinental Cup for sponsorship reasons) was a 4-team association football tournament held at the Mumbai Football Arena in the Indian city of Mumbai between 1 and 10 June 2018. The tournament was organized by the AIFF as part of the senior men's team's preparation for 2019 AFC Asian Cup. India won the tournament by defeating Kenya 2–0 in the final on 10 June 2018.

Participating nations 
The FIFA Rankings, as of 1 June 2018:
 (72)
 (97)
 (112)
 (120)
 (121)

Initially, South Africa was announced to participate in the tournament but Kenya later replaced them when South Africa expressed its inability to participate. The other two nations participated in the tournament were Chinese Taipei from AFC region and New Zealand from the OFC region.

Group stage

Final

Winners

Crowd attendance 
After a poor attendance of 2,569 for the first match of the tournament, Indian captain Sunil Chhetri uploaded a video on his Twitter and Instagram accounts pleading for Indians to attend Indian football matches. Chhetri's plea was endorsed by other sports people, including Indian cricket captain Virat Kohli, cricket legend Sachin Tendulkar, and tennis player Sania Mirza. People responded to the plea by booking tickets for India's upcoming game against Kenya, and the game was sold out before the match day. The match was Chhetri's 100th cap for India in which he scored a brace, leading India to win 3–0. The tweet was the most retweeted tweet in 2018, per Twitter India and was awarded The Golden Tweet.

Broadcasting rights 
Star Sports did broadcast for the 2018 Intercontinental Cup (India) on Star Sports HD2 & Star Sports 2. It was also streamed live on Hotstar and Jio TV.

Goalscorers
8 goals
  Sunil Chhetri

2 goals
  Jockins Atudo

1 goal

  Andre De Jong
  Clifton Miheso
  Dennis Odhiambo
  Myer Bevan
  Moses Dyer
  Jeje Lalpekhlua
  Ovella Ochieng
  Pronay Halder
  Sarpreet Singh
  Timothy Otieno
  Udanta Singh

See also
Intercontinental Cup (India)

References

International association football competitions hosted by India
Sports competitions in Mumbai
Intercontinental Cup (India)
Intercontinental Cup (India)
Intercontinental Cup (India)